Andrei Cătălin Albu (born 3 June 2004) is a Romanian professional footballer who plays as a central midfielder.

Club career

FC U Craiova 1948
He made his league debut on 16 May 2022 in Liga I match against Sepsi OSK.

References

External links
 
 

2004 births
Living people
People from Dolj County
Romanian footballers
Association football midfielders
Liga I players
FC U Craiova 1948 players